Banshees Over Canada is a 19-minute 1943 Canadian documentary film, made by the National Film Board of Canada (NFB). The film was produced by Sydney Newman and directed by James Beveridge. The film's Canadian French title was Vautours au-dessus du Canada. It was produced as part of the Canada Carries On series.

Synopsis
British preparations for a German bombing raid are examined, as well as the resultant destruction caused by the raid and the defences mounted by Britain's Royal Air Force. Canadian preparations for air defence, should the country be attacked during the then-current Second World War is also highlighted.

Production
Typical of the NFB's Canada Carries On series of documentary short films, Banshees Over Canada relied heavily on newsreel footage. The British sequences were from the British Ministry of Information. The later sequences of air-raid and civil defence preparations in Canada were primarily filmed in British Columbia. Vancouver Motion Pictures was responsible for the B.C. footage. The locally owned production company produced a number of NFB titles during the 1940s. The deep baritone voice of stage actor Lorne Greene was featured in the narration of Banshees Over Canada.

Reception
As part of the Canada Carries On series, Banshees Over Canada was produced in 35 mm for the theatrical market. Each film was shown over a six-month period as part of the shorts or newsreel segments in approximately 800 theatres across Canada. The NFB had an arrangement with Famous Players theatres to ensure that Canadians from coast-to-coast could see them, with further distribution by Columbia Pictures.

After the six-month theatrical tour ended, individual films were made available on 16 mm to schools, libraries, churches and factories, extending the life of these films for another year or two. They were also made available to film libraries operated by university and provincial authorities. A total of 199 films were produced before the series was canceled in 1959.

References

Notes

Bibliography

 Ellis, Jack C. and Betsy A. McLane. New History of Documentary Film. London: Continuum International Publishing Group, 2005. .

External links
 
 

1943 films
1943 short films
Canadian aviation films
Canadian black-and-white films
Canadian short documentary films
Canadian World War II propaganda films
Documentary films about military aviation
National Film Board of Canada documentaries
1943 documentary films
Black-and-white documentary films
Canada Carries On
Columbia Pictures short films
Quebec films
Films produced by Sydney Newman
1940s English-language films
Films directed by James Beveridge
1940s Canadian films